Here follows a list of notable people associated with Skidmore College in Saratoga Springs, New York. It includes graduates, attendees, faculty, and presidents of the college.

Distinguished alumni

Arts and entertainment 
Zazie Beetz, actor, Deadpool 2 and Atlanta (Class of 2013)
Lake Bell, actor, Boston Legal and Childrens Hospital (attended)
Jon Bernthal, actor,  The Walking Dead and The Wolf of Wall Street (attended)
Eddie Cahill, actor, Miracle and CSI: NY (attended)
Ruth Sacks Caplin, screenwriter of Mrs. Palfrey at the Claremont (Class of 1941)
Kyle Carey, singer and musician (Class of 2008)
Kathleen Collins, playwright, filmmaker, director, civil rights activist, and educator, Losing Ground (Class of 1963)
Kelly Curtis, actor (Class of 1978)
Evan Dando, musician with The Lemonheads (attended)
Grace DeGennaro, visual artist (Class of 1978)
Pete Donnelly, musician, founding member of The Figgs, as well as former member of NRBQ, Soul Asylum, Mike Viola and the Candybutchers (Class of 2017)
Garrett "G. Love" Dutton, musician with G. Love & Special Sauce (attended)
Judith Flanders, author and historian (Class of 1980)
Chris Fleming, comedian and creator of the web series Gayle (Class of 2009)
Anthony Geraci, blues pianist and an original member of both Sugar Ray & the Bluetones and Ronnie Earl & the Broadcasters.
Tawny Godin, former Miss America 1976 (attended)
Holter Graham, actor and producer (Class of 1994)
Mick Grøndahl, bassist with Jeff Buckley
Justin Henry, actor, Kramer vs. Kramer and Sixteen Candles (Class of 1993)
Scott Jacoby, record producer (Class of 1993)
Ian Kahn, actor, Turn: Washington's Spies (Class of 1994)
Skylar Kergil, musician and activist (Class of 2013)
Jason Keyser, musician with death metal band Skinless (Class of 2013)
Elizabeth LeCompte, co-founder and director of The Wooster Group, and a MacArthur Fellow (Class of 1966)
Sydney Magruder Washington, ballet dancer (Class of 2014)
Evan Mast, musician with Ratatat (Class of 2001)
Molly McGrann, novelist and literary critic (Class of 1995)
Will Menaker, political satirist and host of Chapo Trap House
David Miner, television producer, 30 Rock and The Tracy Morgan Show (Class of 1991)
Jack Mulhern, actor, The Society and Mare of Easttown (Class of 2017)
Michael Nozik, film producer, Crossing Delancey, The Motorcycle Diaries, and Quiz Show (Class of 1976)
Nelle Nugent, Broadway producer, Time Stands Still (Class of 1960)
Julia Nunes, singer, songwriter, YouTube celebrity (Class of 2011)
Jason Reitman, filmmaker, Juno and Up in the Air (attended)
Ariana Richards, actor and painter, Jurassic Park (Class of 2002)
Jane Roberts, author and poet (attended)
Gloria Sachs, fashion designer (Class of 1947)
Sybil Shearer, modern dance pioneer and writer (Class of 1934)
Micah Sloat, actor, Paranormal Activity (Class of 2004)
Matthew Wolff, graphic designer (Class of 2012)
Michael Zegen, actor, Rescue Me (Class of 2001)

Athletics 
Matt Hyson, professional wrestler whose stage name is Spike Dudley (Class of 1992)

Business 
Barbara Bloom, senior vice president of CBS Daytime
Cynthia Carroll, CEO of Anglo American, ranked 14th most powerful woman in the world by Forbes in 2010 (Class of 1978)
Ben Cohen, co-founder of Ben & Jerry's Ice Cream (attended)
Helen Corbitt, chef and cookbook author (Class of 1928)
Louise Fili, graphic designer (Class of 1973)
Shep Murray, CEO and co-founder of Vineyard Vines (Class of 1993)
J. Joel Quadracci, CEO of Quad/Graphics (Class of 1991)
Benjamin Sargent, chef and Food Network television personality (Class of 2000)
Wilma Stein Tisch, board member and philanthropist (Class of 1948)

Education and science 
Benjamin Bolger, sociology professor at the College of William & Mary (MA 2007)
Sallie W. Chisholm, oceanographer (Class of 1969)
Jens David Ohlin, dean of Cornell Law School (Class of 1996)
Hazel Stiebeling, nutritionist and early developer of "daily allowance" guidelines (Class of 1915)
Amy Townsend-Small, director of the Environmental Studies Program at the University of Cincinnati (Class of 1998)

Journalism 
Arwa Damon, Middle East correspondent for CNN (Class of 1999)
Grace Mirabella, author and former editor-in-chief of Vogue (Class of 1950)
Cal Perry, correspondent for CNN based in the network's Beirut bureau (Class of 2001)
Webster Tarpley, author, historian, conspiracy theorist (MA)

Politics 
Senator Joseph Bruno, New York State Senate Majority Leader (also received an honorary doctorate) (Class of 1952)
Jennie Cave, first woman mayor of Norwalk, Connecticut (Class of 1923)
Fred Guttenberg, political activist (Class of 1988)
Helene Schneider, former mayor of Santa Barbara, California (Class of 1992)
Kate Snyder, mayor of Portland, Maine (Class of 1992)
Anne Wexler, political advisor and lobbyist (Class of 1951)

Notable faculty 
Regis Brodie, Art professor
Sheldon Solomon, Psychology professor
Kathryn H. Starbuck, Executive Secretary and law professor

Presidents of the College 
Charles Henry Keyes (1912–1925)
Henry T. Moore (1925–1957)
Val H. Wilson (1957–1965)
Joseph C. Palamountain, Jr. (1965–1987)
David H. Porter (1987–1999)
Jamienne S. Studley (1999–2003)
Philip A. Glotzbach (2003–2020)
Marc C. Conner (2020–present)

References 

Skidmore College
Saratoga Springs, New York